As of July 2016, the International Union for Conservation of Nature (IUCN) lists 58 extinct species, 46 possibly extinct species, and one extinct in the wild species of insect.

Caddisflies

Extinct species

Mayflies

Extinct species
Pecatonica river mayfly (Acanthametropus pecatonica)
Robust burrowing mayfly (Pentagenia robusta)

Flies

Extinct species

Earwigs

Extinct species
Saint Helena earwig (Labidura herculeana)

Plecoptera

Extinct species
Robert's stonefly (Alloperla roberti)

Hemiptera

Extinct species
Clavicoccus erinaceus
Phyllococcus oahuensis

Blattodea

Extinct species
Margatteoidea amoena
Possibly extinct species

Phasmatodea

Extinct species
Ridley's stick insect (Pseudobactricia ridleyi)

Orthoptera

Extinct species

Possibly extinct species

Extinct in the wild species
Oahu deceptor bush cricket (Leptogryllus deceptor)

Hymenopterans

Possibly extinct species

Mantodeans

Possibly extinct species
Spined dwarf mantis (Ameles fasciipennis)

Lepidoptera

Extinct species

Possibly extinct species
Pieris wollastoni

Beetles

Extinct species

Possibly extinct species
Xylotrechus gemellus
Zamodes obscurus

Odonata

Extinct species
Maui upland damselfly (Megalagrion jugorum)
Possibly extinct species

See also 
 List of least concern insects
 List of near threatened insects
 List of vulnerable insects
 List of endangered insects
 List of critically endangered insects
 List of data deficient insects

References 

 
Insects
Recently extinct insects
Insects
Recently extinct insects
Recently extinct insects